Kevin Ryan (9 April 1937 – 11 June 1999) was an Australian rules footballer who played with Carlton in the Victorian Football League (VFL).

Notes

External links 

Kevin Ryan's profile at Blueseum

1937 births
1999 deaths
Carlton Football Club players
Australian rules footballers from Victoria (Australia)